Major General Sir Walter Arthur George Burns,  (29 January 1911 – 5 May 1997) was a British Army officer and native of Hertfordshire.

Early life
Burns was born on 29 January 1911 to art collector Walter Spencer Morgan Burns (1872–1929), and Ruth Evelyn Cavendish-Bentinck (1883–1978), who married in 1907. His sister was Cynthia Mary Burns, the first wife of Sir John Carew Pole, 12th Baronet.

His father was a nephew of the prominent American banker J. P. Morgan and a grandson of Junius Spencer Morgan. His maternal grandparents were American heiress Elizabeth Livingston Cavendish-Bentinck (a daughter of Maturin Livingston Jr.) and William George Cavendish-Bentinck MP (a son of George Cavendish-Bentinck MP). Through his sister, he was an uncle to Sir Richard Carew Pole, 13th Baronet.

Burns was educated at Eton and Trinity College, Cambridge.

Military career
He obtained a commission in the Coldstream Guards in 1932, and served as aide-de-camp to the Viceroy of India, the Marquess of Linlithgow from 1938 to 1940.

He then held several staff posts during the Second World War: adjutant of the 1st Battalion Coldstream Guards from 1940 to 1941 (in which service he received the Military Cross), brigade major of the 9th Infantry Brigade from 1941 to 1942, Support Group Guards Armoured Division in 1942 and 32nd Guards Brigade from 1942 to 1943.

Post-war, Burns commanded the 3rd Battalion of the Coldstream Guards in Palestine, during the Palestine Emergency, from 1947 until 1950. He then served as Assistant Adjutant General at the London District Headquarters 1951 to 1952, as lieutenant colonel of the Coldstream 1952 to 1955, as commander of the 4th Guards Brigade 1955 to 1959, and as Major-General commanding the Household Brigade and General Officer Commanding London District from 1959 to 1962. In 1962, he was made a Knight Commander of the Royal Victorian Order and received the colonelcy of the Coldstream, which he held until 1994. The previous year, he had been appointed Lord Lieutenant of Hertfordshire and served in that office for the next 25 years.

Burns was a patron of cricket, serving as President of the North Mymms Cricket Club from 1931 until his death. He lived at North Mymms Park.

Legacy and honours
In 1972, he was appointed a Knight of the Venerable Order of St John, and was upgraded to a Knight Grand Cross of the Royal Victorian Order on 31 December 1990. Burns was a recipient of the Knight Grand Cross of the Royal Victorian Order, Companion of the Order of the Bath, Distinguished Service Order, Officer of the Order of the British Empire, Military Cross, and the Venerable Order of Saint John.

References

External links

 Sir (Walter Arthur) George Burns (1911-1997), Major-General at the National Portrait Gallery, London
 Major General Sir George Burns (d.1997), KCVO, CB, DSO, OBE, MC, Lord Lieutenant (1961–1986) by Richard Foster

 

|-

|-

1911 births
1997 deaths
Alumni of Trinity College, Cambridge
British Army major generals
British Army personnel of World War II
British military personnel of the Palestine Emergency
Coldstream Guards officers
Companions of the Distinguished Service Order
Companions of the Order of the Bath
Knights Grand Cross of the Royal Victorian Order
Knights of the Order of St John
Lord-Lieutenants of Hertfordshire
Military personnel from London
Officers of the Order of the British Empire
People educated at Eton College
People from London
Recipients of the Military Cross